The Monkey King, also known as The Lost Empire, is a 2001 television miniseries produced by NBC and the SciFi Channel. It is a contemporary take on the classic 16th-century novel Journey to the West. It stars Bai Ling, Thomas Gibson, Russell Wong, Eddie Marsan, and Randall Duk Kim. The miniseries was directed by Peter MacDonald and written by Asian American dramatist David Henry Hwang.

Plot 
Nicholas Orton (played by Thomas Gibson) is an American businessman who has lived in China for several years. He has a chance encounter with a beautiful Chinese lady (played by Bai Ling) who says that he is the only one who can save the world from reverting five-hundred years. He is unswayed by this until many modern buildings begin disappearing before his eyes. This mystical lady (revealed later as Guanyin, the bodhisattva of compassion) transports him to a portal which offers entrance, through the teachings of Confucius (played by Ric Young), to the ancient Chinese underworld.

When Orton (soon to be named The Scholar From Above) reaches the other side of the portal, he finds that his studies of Confucius will come in handy for the path that lies ahead. Orton's first action is to rescue Sun Wukong, the Monkey King, from the mountain in which he has been imprisoned for centuries. Wukong travels with Orton in his quest to save the original manuscript of Journey to the West from retroactive destruction; if the story itself is erased from history, all of the people who were ever inspired by the lessons it teaches will be worse off, and history will permanently change for the poorer. They are later joined by Zhu Bajie (Pigsy) and Sha Wujing (Friar Sand) to help them on their way.

Reception
Robert Bianco of USA Today called it "silly and confused." Variety called it "tedious" and said "all the strong technical work comes across as the outer shell of an empty nut."

The Ratings were poor it recorded one of the lowest ratings ever for a miniseries on NBC. Critics said it was due to oversaturation of special-effects-driven miniseries dropping in popularity.

Release
The film is available on DVD and videocassette. There was also a novelization of the miniseries by Kathryn Wesley released under the title The Monkey King.

References

External links

Works based on Journey to the West
2001 films
2000s adventure films
2000s American television miniseries
American fantasy adventure films
2000s American science fiction television series
2000s English-language films
Films directed by Peter MacDonald
Sonar Entertainment miniseries
Sword and sorcery films
Television shows based on Journey to the West
American fantasy television series
2000s American films